Peter Bowers may refer to:

Peter M. Bowers (1918–2003), American aviation journalist, historian and aeronautical engineer
Peter Bowers (Australian journalist) (1930–2010)